Başak may refer to:

Given name
 Başak Demirtaş(born 1977),  Kurdish-Turkish author
Başak Eraydın (born 1994), Turkish tennis player
 Başak Ersoy (born 1991), Turkish women's footballer
 Başak Gündoğdu (born 1992), Turkish women's footballer
 Başak İçinözbebek (born 1994), Turkish women's footballer
 Başak Köklükaya (born 1974), Turkish actress
 Başak Senova (born 1970), Turkish curator
Başak Parlak(born 3 November 1989), Turkish actress and model

Surname
 Chris Başak (born 1978), American baseball player
 Rasim Başak (born 1980), Azerbaijani-Turkish basketball player
 Süleyman Başak, Turkish Cypriot financial economist

Turkish feminine given names
Turkish-language surnames